Mallory–Weiss syndrome or gastro-esophageal laceration syndrome refers to bleeding from a laceration in the mucosa at the junction of the stomach and esophagus. This is usually caused by severe vomiting because of alcoholism or bulimia, but can be caused by any condition which causes violent vomiting and retching such as food poisoning. The syndrome presents with hematemesis. The laceration is sometimes referred to as a Mallory–Weiss tear.

Signs and symptoms
Mallory–Weiss Syndrome often presents as an episode of vomiting up blood (hematemesis) after violent retching or vomiting, but may also be noticed as old blood in the stool (melena), and a history of retching may be absent.

In most cases, the bleeding stops spontaneously after 24–48 hours, but endoscopic or surgical treatment is sometimes required. The condition is rarely fatal.

Causes
It is often associated with alcoholism and eating disorders and there is some evidence that presence of a hiatal hernia is a predisposing condition. Forceful vomiting causes tearing of the mucosa at the junction. NSAID abuse is also a rare association. In rare instances some chronic disorders like Ménière's disease that cause long term nausea and vomiting could be a factor.

The tear involves the mucosa and submucosa but not the muscular layer (contrast to Boerhaave syndrome which involves all the layers). Most patients are between the ages of 30 and 50 years, although it has been reported in infants aged as young as 3 weeks, as well as in older people 
Hyperemesis gravidarum, which is severe morning sickness associated with vomiting and retching in pregnancy, is also a known cause of Mallory–Weiss tear.

Diagnosis
Definitive diagnosis is by endoscopy of the esophagus and stomach. Proper history taking by the medical doctor to distinguish other conditions that cause haematemesis but definitive diagnosis is by conducting esophagogastroduodenoscopy.

Treatment
Treatment is usually supportive as persistent bleeding is uncommon. However cauterization or injection of epinephrine to stop the bleeding may be undertaken during the index endoscopy procedure. Very rarely embolization of the arteries supplying the region may be required to stop the bleeding.  If all other methods fail, high gastrostomy can be used to ligate the bleeding vessel. A Blakemore tube will not be able to stop bleeding as here the bleeding is arterial and the pressure in the balloon is not sufficient to overcome the arterial pressure.

History
The condition was first described in 1929 by G. Kenneth Mallory and Soma Weiss in 15 alcoholic patients.

See also
 Boerhaave syndrome – Full thickness esophageal ruptures are also often secondary to vomiting/retching.
 Hematemesis

References

External links 

Diseases of oesophagus, stomach and duodenum
Esophagus disorders
Vomiting
Syndromes